Federico Gastón Castro (born 28 August 1992) is an Argentine professional footballer who plays as a forward for Curicó Unido.

Career
Castro started in Defensa y Justicia's youth, before moving to Deportivo Maipú who selected him for his senior bow on 21 October 2012 in a 4–1 victory over Juventud Unida Universitario. Months later, Castro went across Torneo Federal A to Cambaceres. Twenty appearances followed. A move to fellow third tier outfit Defensores de Belgrano was completed on 30 June 2014. He scored on his club debut, netting a winner over Alvarado on the way to five overall goals; including a brace over Talleres. In January 2015, Castro joined Primera División's Sarmiento. His pro league bow came months later versus Arsenal de Sarandí.

Having featured four times in the 2015 campaign for Sarmiento, they loaned him out in early 2016 to Santamarina of Primera B Nacional. He subsequently scored in matches against Instituto and Gimnasia y Esgrima as they finished thirteenth. Defensores de Belgrano resigned Castro ahead of the 2016–17 Torneo Federal A. Fifty-six fixtures and fourteen goals occurred across two seasons with them. On 30 June 2018, Castro signed with Independiente Rivadavia in Primera B Nacional. Twenty-seven total appearances and seven goals occurred, including two in the end of season promotion play-offs versus Nueva Chicago.

In July 2019, Castro went abroad after agreeing terms with Chilean Primera División side Palestino.

Career statistics
.

References

External links

1992 births
Living people
Footballers from Buenos Aires
Argentine footballers
Association football forwards
Argentine expatriate footballers
Expatriate footballers in Chile
Argentine expatriate sportspeople in Chile
Torneo Argentino A players
Primera C Metropolitana players
Torneo Federal A players
Argentine Primera División players
Primera Nacional players
Chilean Primera División players
Deportivo Maipú players
Defensores de Cambaceres footballers
Defensores de Belgrano de Villa Ramallo players
Club Atlético Sarmiento footballers
Club y Biblioteca Ramón Santamarina footballers
Independiente Rivadavia footballers
Club Deportivo Palestino footballers
Curicó Unido footballers